In geometry, a simplicial polytope is a polytope whose facets are all simplices. For example, a simplicial polyhedron in three dimensions contains only triangular faces and corresponds via Steinitz's theorem to a maximal planar graph.

They are topologically dual to simple polytopes. Polytopes which are both
simple and simplicial are either simplices or two-dimensional polygons.

Examples 
Simplicial polyhedra include:
 Bipyramids
 Gyroelongated dipyramids
Deltahedra (equilateral triangles)
 Platonic 
 tetrahedron, octahedron, icosahedron
 Johnson solids:
triangular bipyramid, pentagonal bipyramid, snub disphenoid, triaugmented triangular prism, gyroelongated square dipyramid
 Catalan solids:
 triakis tetrahedron, triakis octahedron, tetrakis hexahedron, disdyakis dodecahedron, triakis icosahedron, pentakis dodecahedron, disdyakis triacontahedron

Simplicial tilings:
 Regular:
 triangular tiling
Laves tilings:
 tetrakis square tiling,  triakis triangular tiling, kisrhombille tiling

Simplicial 4-polytopes include:
convex regular 4-polytope
 4-simplex, 16-cell, 600-cell
 Dual convex uniform honeycombs:
Disphenoid tetrahedral honeycomb
Dual of cantitruncated cubic honeycomb
Dual of omnitruncated cubic honeycomb
Dual of cantitruncated alternated cubic honeycomb

Simplicial higher polytope families:
simplex
cross-polytope (Orthoplex)

See also 
 Simplicial complex
 Delaunay triangulation

Notes

References 

Euclidean geometry
Polytopes